The Roly Mo Show is a British children's television series featuring a cast of puppets; it is a spin-off of Fimbles, similarly to how the series parodied Sesame Street, Rainbow and Ni Ni's Treehouse and was created by Novel Entertainment. The series consists of 100 episodes, each 14 minutes in length. In addition, there are 20 storytimes and 10 Christmas storytimes, each 2 minutes in length.

The series was broadcast on CBeebies between 8 November 2004 and 10 January 2006. Roly Mo was a regular storyteller character in the better known Fimbles show, and The Roly Mo Show draws heavily on this. The show is noted for its particularly gentle and pleasant characters and plots.

A show called Christmas Storytime aired on the CBeebies channel in December 2005.

Format
Each episode follows a general format.
 Little Bo is visiting Roly Mo after school. She hangs up her rucksack and hat and goes down the slide into the main part of Roly's house.
 One of the characters has a problem; this is the main plot element throughout the episode.
 Someone reads a story from Roly Mo's library, preceded by the "When You Take a Look Inside a Book" song.  Most of the time this is Roly, although sometimes this is Little Bo, Rockit, Yugo and Migo or a combination.  The story is related to the problem and often gives an idea for its solution.
 Little Bo looks in her 'Busy Book', starting the segment of an animated Fimble solving an educational puzzle.
 The problem is solved, often with a song.
 The show closes with voice-overs during the credits, which are often humorous or provide further closure.

Characters

Quotes
"I'll be back in a Roly Mo!"
"It's been a Roly Moly day!"
"Lets roll like Roly Mo!"
"Story-time with Roly Mo! Our favourite time of day!"
"Are you sitting comfortably? Then I'll begin."

Transmissions

Episodes
 "My Best Things"
 "Sleepover"
 "Bibby"
 "Guess Who’s Coming For Tea?"
 "The First Time"
 "No Place Like Home"
 "Too Cold"
 "Homework"
 "Sweet Dreams"
 "Snoot the Moon"
 "Can I Help You?"
 "Umbrella"
 "Spend Spend Spend"
 "Sports Day"
 "Scarf"
 "Bathtime"
 "Thunderstorm"
 "Yugo’s Lazy Day"
 "For True Life?"
 "Rain"
 "Little Bo’s Cold"
 "Red Letter Day"
 "Stick Em Up"
 "Valley of the Moles"
 "Library Tidy Up"
 "Pleased to Meet You"
 "Sandwich"
 "Sshhh"
 "Snudge is Missing"
 "Beach"
 "Teatime"
 "Happy Families"
 "Like a Rolling Stone"
 "When I’m 64"
 "Dressing Up"
 "Treasure Hunt"
 "Cards"
 "Doctor Who?"
 "The Collector"
 "Imagine"
 "Hiccups"
 "Cuddlies Picnic"
 "Music Class"
 "Seed"
 "Just a Minute"
 "Babysitting"
 "String!"
 "Rubber Mole"
 "Playtime"
 "Mine!"
 "Too Hot"
 "Little Bo Peep"
 "Snap"
 "Bump"
 "Four Season’s In One Day"
 "You Can Drive My Car"
 "Dear Diary"
 "Rockit’s Birthday"
 "Everyone’s A Winner"
 "What’s in Little Bo’s Rucksack?"
 "What’s That Sound"
 "Growing Up"
 "Little Bo’s Birthday"
 "Word Up!"
 "Jigsaw"
 "Lights Out"
 "Torch"
 "Bookworm"
 "Making Music"
 "Tickly Bits"
 "Blow Out"
 "Think of a Number"
 "Double Identity"
 "Rollerskating"
 "Rushing About"
 "Oh Yes It Is"
 "Small Is Beautiful"
 "Painting"
 "Peace and Quiet"
 "Fimbles Storytime"
 "Little Bo’s Sad"
 "Chinese Whispers"
 "Hide and Peep"
 "Show and Tell"
 "Roly’s Sleepy Day"
 "Picnic in the Garden"
 "Surprise!"
 "Washing Up"
 "Onions"
 "Come Dancing"
 "Little Bo Riding Hood"
 "Looking For Clues"
 "Tidying Up"
 "Three Amigos"
 "What Happens Next"
 "On Being A Snoot"
 "Hand in Glove"
 "Afternoon Nap"
 "Out of the Blue"
 "Perfect Day"

Other media
Roly Mo has been referenced many times in the TV series Horrid Henry, with both shows being created by Novel Entertainment.

On 28 December 2007, Roly Mo appeared in a special puppet edition of The Weakest Link. The show, which was presented by Anne Robinson, was aired at 6pm on BBC One. Prior to the fourth round, at Anne's and the audience's request, he led the other puppets in a rendition of his "When You Take a Look Inside a Book" song. He was voted off after the fifth round.

The Roly Mo is also the name of a Scottish indie rock band fronted by Joe Morton, known for songs such as "Diamond Doll" and "I Miss The Dancing". In July 2022, they were one of the acts playing the River Stage at the TRNSMT festival in Glasgow Green.

International airings 

In Australia until, 30 September 2008, The Roly Mo Show was broadcast on ABC and its third digital channel ABC2.

As of 1 June 2007 The Roly Mo Show (粉宝乐园) is being broadcast in China on Shanghai Media Group's children's network HAHA TV. All 200 episodes are being shown sequentially and dubbed in Mandarin Chinese. As the show in its original format is only 19 minutes long, the show has been lengthened by 5 minutes for the Chinese market.

In Vietnam, since 2008, The Roly Mo Show is a part of the show 5 Minutes to Learn English Everyday (5 phút học tiếng Anh mỗi ngày), which is produced by HTV4 together with many famous English centers and international schools. However, in VBC, it is a separate show named Những chú heo con Fimbles.

From June 2008, the show has also been broadcast by Tata Sky DTH in India under partnership from the BBC on the country's variant of the CBeebies channel.

In Colombia from 2004 and 2007, it was broadcast by Señal Colombia.

In New Zealand, the show was played on TV2.

In South Africa, The Roly Mo Show began airing on SABC 1.

In Singapore, it was broadcast by Central and played it on their children's block Kids Central. The series aired in Singapore from 2003 to 2006 and then on Okto from 2011.

In Hong Kong, the series was screened on TVB Pearl.

In Malta, The Roly Mo Show was aired on TVM.

In Thailand, the English version of the series was broadcast on Thai cable television TrueVisions (originally known as UBC at the time) on their children's network UBC Spark.

In the Republic of Ireland, The Roly Mo Show was broadcast on Network 2 (later changed to RTÉ2 in 2004) as part of a lineup of programmes for younger children called The Den.

Awards
 Royal Television Society Educational Television Awards 2004
Nominated for Best Early Years Programme
 Royal Television Society Educational Television Awards 2005
Nominated for Best Schools Programme - 0–5 Years (for the episode Imagine)

References

External links
 Fimbles and The Roly Mo Show on youtube.com
 The Roly Mo Show at IMDb
 CBeebies - The Roly Mo Show at bbc.co.uk
 Educational content of The Roly Mo Show
 Novel Entertainment

BBC children's television shows
2000s British children's television series
British preschool education television series
British television shows featuring puppetry
British television spin-offs
British parody television series
Television series about mammals
Television series about frogs
CBeebies
2000s preschool education television series